The Black Sea Soviet Republic (March–May 1918) was a republic of the Russian SFSR within the territory that corresponded to Black Sea Governorate in the Russian Empire.  Its seat was Novorossiysk. 

It was merged into the Kuban-Black Sea Soviet Republic.

References

Subdivisions of the Russian Soviet Federative Socialist Republic
History of Kuban
Early Soviet republics
States and territories established in 1918
Russian-speaking countries and territories
Former socialist republics
Post–Russian Empire states